Paul Jenisch, (also known as Paulus Jenisch, Jenisius or Jenischius; 1551 – 9 November 1612) was a German Lutheran pastor and academic.

His career
Jenisch was born in Annaberg.  In 1596 he became the superintendent of Eilenburg, and 1603 was the first chaplain of Dresden.  In 1610 he became the preacher of Oberhof.  He died in Dresden.

Bibliography 
 Fritz Roth: Restlose Auswertungen von Leichenpredigten und Personalschriften für genealogische und kulturhistorische Zwecke. Band 7, R 6841
 Reinhold Grünberg: Sächsische Pfarrer. Freiberg 1940
 Pfarrbuch Kirchenprovinz Sachsen. Band 4

External links 
 

1551 births
1612 deaths
People from Annaberg-Buchholz
17th-century German Lutheran clergy
Clergy from Dresden
German male non-fiction writers
16th-century German Lutheran clergy